Henry Lien is an author of juvenile speculative fiction active since 2013.

Biography
Lien is originally from Taiwan and lives in Hollywood, California. He has been an attorney, a teacher at UCLA Extension, and an art dealer in Los Angeles, representing artists from the Americas and Eurasia. He has also served as president of the West Hollywood Fine Art Dealers' Association and on the board of the West Hollywood Avenues of Art and Design.

Literary career
Lien graduated from Clarion West in 2012. He is author of the Peasprout Chen middle grade fantasy series, published by Henry Holt and Company. His fiction has appeared in various publications, including Asimov's Science Fiction, Analog Science Fiction and Fact, The Magazine of Fantasy & Science Fiction, and Lady Churchill's Rosebud Wristlet. In addition to his fiction, Lien has served as arts editor for Interfictions Online.

Awards
Lien was nominated for the 2014 Nebula Award for Best Novelette for "Pearl Rehabilitative Colony for Ungrateful Daughters," which also placed second in the 2014 Asimov's Reader's Poll. His "The Ladies' Aquatic Gardening Society" was nominated for the 2016 Nebula Award for Best Novelette and Peasprout Chen, Future Legend of Skate and Sword was nominated for the 2019 Andre Norton Award.

Bibliography

Novels
Peasprout Chen, Future Legend of Skate and Sword (2018)
Peasprout Chen: Battle of Champions (2019)

Short fiction

"Pearl Rehabilitative Colony for Ungrateful Daughters" (2013)
"The Great Leap of Shin" (2015)
"Bilingual" (2015)
"The Ladies' Aquatic Gardening Society" (2015)
"The Shadow You Cast Is Me" (2015)

References

External links 
 
Interview at Lightspeed Magazine
 Interview at Publishers Weekly

Living people
American speculative fiction writers
1970 births
Taiwanese children's writers